Gödel's Loophole is an "inner contradiction" in the Constitution of the United States which Austrian-American logician, mathematician, and analytic philosopher Kurt Gödel postulated in 1947. The loophole would permit the American democracy to be legally turned into a dictatorship. Gödel told his friend Oskar Morgenstern about the existence of the flaw and Morgenstern told Albert Einstein about it at the time, but Morgenstern, in his recollection of the incident in 1971, never mentioned the exact problem as Gödel saw it. This has led to speculation about the precise nature of what has come to be called "Gödel's Loophole". It has been called "one of the great unsolved problems of constitutional law" by F. E. Guerra-Pujol.

Background
When Gödel was studying to take his American citizenship test in 1947, he came across what he described as an "inner contradiction" in the U.S. Constitution. At the time, he was at the Institute for Advanced Study in Princeton, New Jersey, where he was good friends with Albert Einstein and Oskar Morgenstern. Gödel told Morgenstern about the flaw in the constitution, which, he said, would allow the United States to legally become a fascist state. Morgenstern tried to convince Gödel that this was very unlikely to happen, but Gödel remained very concerned about it.  He was an Austrian by birth and, having lived through the 1933 coup d'état and escaped from Nazi Germany after the Anschluss, had reason to be concerned about living in a fascist dictatorship.  Morgenstern had a number of discussions with Gödel about his concerns, and also told Einstein about them.

When the date of the examination came some months later, Gödel was being driven to the courthouse in Trenton, New Jersey by Morgenstern and Einstein, who were to be his witnesses. Both had already taken the citizenship test and become naturalized United States citizens. At one point during the drive, Einstein, in the front seat, turned to Gödel in the back and asked – knowing about Gödel's concerns – "Now, Gödel, are you really well prepared for this examination?" According to Morgenstern, Einstein's purpose in asking this was to rattle Gödel, whose reaction amused him.

At the courthouse, witnesses would normally remain outside of the room during a citizenship examination, but because Einstein, a celebrity, was involved, and because the judge, Phillip Forman, had administered the oath of citizenship to Einstein, all three men were invited in. In the course of the examination, Forman asked Gödel what the government of Austria was, to which he replied: "It was a republic, but the constitution was such that it finally was changed into a dictatorship." The judge commented that this could not happen in the U.S., and Gödel responded "Oh, yes, I can prove it," but the judge declined to pursue the matter.

Nature of Gödel's Loophole
Since the exact nature of Gödel's Loophole has never been published, what it is, precisely, is not known. In a 2012 paper, "Gödel's Loophole", F. E. Guerra-Pujol speculates that the problem involves Article V, which describes the process by which the Constitution can be amended.  The loophole is that Article V's procedures can be applied to Article V itself. It can therefore be altered in a "downward" direction, making it easier to alter the article again in the future. So even if, as is now the case, amending the Constitution is difficult to bring about, once Article V is downwardly amended, the next attempt to do so will be easier, and the one after that easier still.

Other writers have speculated that Gödel may have had other parts of the Constitution in mind as well, including the possibility that a partisan ratchet effect, via lifetime Supreme Court appointments and selective application of the law, could permanently stack the Supreme Court with Justices of one political persuasion.

Notes

References

Constitution of the United States
Democracy
Dictatorship
American political philosophy